Sarah LeBrun Ingram (née LeBrun, born 1965/1966) is an American amateur golfer, a member of the Tennessee Golf Hall of Fame and the Tennessee Sports Hall of Fame. She is a former All-American golfer at Duke University who became a three-time winner of the U.S. Women's Mid-Amateur. Ingram represented the U.S. on the Curtis Cup team in 1992, 1994 and 1996. She is a member of the Duke Athletics Hall of Fame. In 1993, Golf Digest, Golfweek and Golf World named her either number one amateur or Amateur Player of the Year.  At age 30, despite winning many titles, she made the decision not to turn pro. She gave up her golf career because she wanted to raise a family and also because of a diagnosis of rheumatoid arthritis. After a 20 year interval of not playing the sport, in 2018 she agreed co-chair 118th U.S. Women's Amateur and was tapped to serve as (non-playing) captain of the 2020 U.S. Curtis Cup team (postponed until 2021). She began playing again and won the 2020 Tennessee Women's Senior Amateur, then won the 2021 Ladies National Golf Association Senior Championship.

Early life
Ingram grew up in Owings Mills, Maryland, a suburb of Baltimore.  Her father, Henry Frances LeBrun, who died in 2011, was the owner of H. Frances LeBrun Co., a real estate and insurance business founded by her paternal grandfather in 1935 and sold to Tongue, Brooks and Co. in 1991. Her mother was Gillian D. LeBrun. Sarah has three sisters: Anne, Clair and Laura. She attended Garrison Forest School. In her youth, she excelled in swimming, equestrian sports, lacrosse, field hockey, tennis and basketball before concentrating on golf as a teenager. At Duke University, she met David Ingram who was on the men's golf team. They were married in 1989, one year after her graduation. The couple settled and remained in Nashville where her husband attended graduate school Vanderbilt's Owen School of Management. David Ingram is the son of Bronson Ingram, an American billionaire heir.

In the late 1980s and early 1990s Ingram became prominent in the world of women's golf. After winning many junior and collegiate titles, she won the 1990 Canadian Women's Amateur by nine strokes. Winning national titles catapulted Ingram into international competition – appearances on three U.S. Curtis Cup teams (1992, 1994, 1996) and the U.S. Women's World Amateur teams (1992, 1994). Ingram said, "I really wanted to be in the Olympics in something. The Curtis Cup was the closest. It was important for me to play. My dad loved all of that."

Career decision
At age 30, she began having pain in her joints and within a few months became unable to bend two fingers on each hand and couldn't grip a golf club; the diagnosis of rheumatoid arthritis was made in October 1996. She had a strong desire to raise a family to begin with, and to stay clear of the pro golf lifestyle. That desire plus the diagnosis convinced her not to turn pro. This was her last year of national competition. She has two sons, Henry and Bronson, born in 1995 and 1997, respectively. Years later she said, "Truthfully, I was kind of ready to step back. I wanted to be able to give my children what my parents gave me, a full opportunity, to be there for them, whatever they needed."

She played very little golf in the next 20 years. In the golf hiatus Ingram became active in equestrian sports as a competitive hunter/jumper and was involved in an equestrian program for children with disabilities. She became immersed in charitable activities.  Around 2016 she agreed to co-chair the 118th U.S. Women's Amateur held in Kingston Springs, Tennessee, at the Golf Club of Tennessee. Ingram admitted that chairing the tournament has stimulated her interest in golf after all these years saying, "My arthritis is a lot better with the new drugs that are out. I've had full mobility for a long time...[my husband] plays a lot of golf. If I want to see him, I better get out there." She said getting new clubs was a revelation; and with her modern driver, she said she can hit the ball as far as she could when she was playing competitively.

Golf resurgence

After a 20 year hiatus from golf, a door opened to reintroduce her to the sport. The Golf Club of Tennessee, where her husband was president, was selected to host the 2018 U.S. Women's Amateur and she agreed to co-chair the event. She was then asked by USGA president Mark Newell to serve as captain of the 2020 U.S. Curtis Cup. The eight-player women's team was to compete against Great Britain in June, 2020, but was postponed due to the COVID-19 pandemic. The match was eventually held at Conwy Golf Club on the northern coast of Wales in August, 2021.
After getting back to playing golf again, she won the 2020 Tennessee Women's Senior Amateur at Nashville's Richland Country club. Ingram said, "I've been back to golf over the last two years and been working on my game". "It's been really fun playing competitively again and this is my first win." The following year, Ingram won the 2021 inaugural Ladies National Golf Association Senior Championship, playing 54 holes at Anthem (Arizona) Golf Club in 10 over to finish six shots ahead of the runner-up.

Amateur wins
Source: 
1986 Maryland State Women's Amateur
1987 Maryland State Women's Amateur
1989 Mid-Atlantic Amateur
1990 Canadian Women's Amateur, Mid-Atlantic Amateur, Nashville Women's City Amateur
1991 U.S. Women's Mid-Amateur, Women's Western Amateur, Tennessee Women's State Amateur
1992 Broadmoor Women's Invitational
1993 U.S. Women's Mid-Amateur, Women's Southern Amateur
1994 U.S. Women's Mid-Amateur, Women's Southern Amateur
2020 Tennessee Women's Senior Amateur
2021 Ladies National Golf Association Senior Championship

Other golf achievements
U.S. Women's Amateur runner-up (1993)
U.S. Women's Open (low amateur, 1995)
Tennessee Golf Hall of Fame
All-American golfer, Duke University
Duke Athletics Hall of Fame
Co-chair 118th U.S. Women's Amateur (2018)
Captain of the USA 2021 Curtis Cup team

U.S. national team appearances
Amateur
Curtis Cup: 1992, 1994, 1996, 2021 (non-playing captain, winners), 2022 (non-playing captain, winners)
Espirito Santo Trophy: 1992, 1994

Notes

References

External links

Conwy Golf Club

American female golfers
Amateur golfers
Duke Blue Devils women's golfers
Golfers from Tennessee
Garrison Forest School people
Ingram family
1960s births
Living people